Archbishop Paulin Pomodimo (born 30 June 1954, in Ziendi) is a Roman Catholic archbishop in the Central African Republic. He was the archbishop of the Roman Catholic Archdiocese of Bangui, the capital city of the Central African Republic. He became archbishop in July 2003, when he replaced Joachim N'Dayen.

He resigned his post as Archbishop of Bangui on 26 May 2009 after a Vatican investigation found that many local priests had violated their vows of chastity, poverty and obedience.

He was later named ombudsman of the Central African Republic by President François Bozizé.

References

1954 births
Living people
People from Bangui
Central African Republic Roman Catholic archbishops
21st-century Roman Catholic archbishops in Africa
People from Sangha-Mbaéré
Roman Catholic archbishops of Bangui
Roman Catholic bishops of Bossangoa